Anthony Lee Dow (April 13, 1945 – July 27, 2022) was an American actor, film producer, director and sculptor. He portrayed Wally Cleaver in the iconic television sitcom Leave It to Beaver from 1957 to 1963. From 1983 to 1989, Dow reprised his role as Wally in a television movie and in The New Leave It to Beaver.

Early life
Dow was born in the Hollywood neighborhood of Los Angeles, California, the son of Muriel Virginia (Montrose), a stuntwoman in westerns, and John Stevens Dow, a designer, and contractor. In his youth, he trained as a swimmer and was a Junior Olympics diving champion.

Screen career

With a little stage acting and two television pilots as his only acting experience, Dow's career began when he went on an open casting call and landed the role of Wally Cleaver in Leave It to Beaver. With the exception of the television pilot, for the show's entire run, from 1957 to 1963, he played the older son of June (played by Barbara Billingsley) and Ward (played by Hugh Beaumont) Cleaver, and the older brother of protagonist Theodore "Beaver" Cleaver (played by Jerry Mathers). As played by Dow, Wally was the "all-American" boy—an intelligent, polite teenager, trusted by his parents, popular with his peers, and liked by his teachers. (Wally was based on the series writer Joe Connelly's son, Jay.) In the show's later years, Dow grew into an attractive, athletic young man and was often featured in "heartthrob"-type magazines aimed principally at teen girls. Producers took advantage of Dow's popularity and scripted episodes delving into Wally's dating life, his after-school jobs, his friends, and his car.

After Leave it to Beaver, Dow appeared on other television shows, including My Three Sons, Dr. Kildare, The Greatest Show on Earth, Never Too Young, and on five episodes of Mr. Novak in three different roles. From 1965 to 1968, he served in the U.S. National Guard, interrupting his acting career. On his return to acting, he guest-starred on the television series Adam-12, Love, American Style, Knight Rider, Square Pegs, The Mod Squad, The Hardy Boys and Emergency!

During the 1970s, Dow continued acting while working in the construction industry, and studying journalism and filmmaking. In 1977, he parodied his role as Wally from Leave it to Beaver in The Kentucky Fried Movie, with Jerry Zucker playing Beaver.

From 1983 to 1989, Dow reprised his role as Wally Cleaver in a reunion television movie and a subsequent sequel series, The New Leave It to Beaver, for which Dow wrote an episode in 1986. In 1987, he was honored by the Young Artist Foundation with its Former Child Star Lifetime Achievement Award for his role as Wally Cleaver.

In 1989, Dow made his debut as a director with an episode of The New Lassie. It was followed by episodes of Get a Life, Harry and the Hendersons, Coach, Babylon 5, Crusade and Star Trek: Deep Space Nine. Dow served as the visual effects supervisor for Babylon 5. In 1996, he provided visual effects for the FOX television movie Doctor Who.

Dow also co-produced The Adventures of Captain Zoom in Outer Space in 1995, and It Came from Outer Space II in 1996.

Stage career
In 1978, Dow and Jerry Mathers starred in a production of the comedy play Boeing, Boeing, which ran for 10 weeks in Kansas City, Missouri.  Dow and Mathers then toured the dinner theater circuit in a production of So Long, Stanley, written specifically for the TV brother duo, for 18 months.

Art career
In addition to acting, directing, producing, and writing, Dow was also a sculptor, creating abstract bronze sculptures. He said about his work: "The figures are abstract and not meant to represent reality, but rather the truth of the interactions as I see and feel them. I find the wood in the hills of Topanga Canyon and each piece evolves from my subconscious. I produce limited editions of nine bronzes using the lost wax process from molds of the original burl sculpture." Reuters wrote of Dow's work that it "features humanlike forms devoid of expression or detail; they are widely open to the viewer's interpretation."

In December 2008, Dow was chosen as one of three sculptors to show at the Société Nationale des Beaux-Arts exhibition, located in the Carrousel du Louvre in Paris, France. He represented the United States delegation, which was composed of artists from the Karen Lynne Gallery. His sculpture shown at the Parisian shopping mall was titled Unarmed Warrior, a bronze figure of a woman holding a shield.

Personal life
Dow married Carol Marlow in June 1969 and their marriage ended in 1980. They had one child, who was born in 1973. In June 1980, Dow married Lauren Shulkind.

In the 1990s, Dow revealed that he had suffered from clinical depression. He subsequently starred in self-help videos chronicling this battle, including the 1998 Beating the Blues. Dow was also hospitalized with pneumonia in 2021.

Death
In May 2022, Dow was diagnosed with liver cancer. He died July 27, 2022, a day after his death was widely misreported.

Selected filmography

Actor
 Leave It to Beaver (234 episodes, 1957–1963)
 The Eleventh Hour as Bob Quincy in "Four Feet in the Morning" (1963)
 Dr. Kildare (one episode, 1963)
 The Greatest Show on Earth (one episode, 1964)
 My Three Sons (one episode, 1964)
 Mr. Novak (five episodes, 1963–1965)
 Never Too Young (153 episodes, 1965)
 Adam-12 (one episode, 1970)
 Love, American Style (one episode, 1971)
 The Mod Squad (one episode, 1971)
 Emergency! ("Brushfire", 1972)
 Death Scream (1975)
 General Hospital (unknown episodes, 1975)
 The Kentucky Fried Movie (1977)
 The Hardy Boys/Nancy Drew Mysteries (one episode, 1977)
 Square Pegs (two episodes, 1982)
 Quincy, M.E. (one episode, 1983)
 Knight Rider (one episode, 1983)
 High School U.S.A. (1983)
 Murder, She Wrote (one episode, 1987)
 The New Mike Hammer (one episode, 1987)
 Back to the Beach (1987)
 The New Leave It to Beaver, or Still the Beaver (1985–1989)
 Charles in Charge (one episode, 1989)
 Freddy's Nightmares, or A Nightmare on Elm Street: The Series (two episodes, 1990)
 The Adventures of Captain Zoom in Outer Space (1995)
 Beyond Belief: Fact or Fiction (one episode, 1998)
 Diagnosis: Murder (two episodes, 1999)
 Dickie Roberts: Former Child Star (2003)

Visual effects
Babylon 5 (unknown episodes)
The Adventures of Captain Zoom in Outer Space (1995)
Doctor Who (1996)

Producer
The Adventures of Captain Zoom in Outer Space (1995)
It Came from Outer Space II (1996)

Writer
The New Leave It to Beaver (one episode, 1986)

Director
"Field of Fire", Star Trek: Deep Space Nine (season 7)
Babylon 5 (several episodes)
Get a Life (episode "Dadicus")
Coach (several episodes)
Harry and the Hendersons

References

External links
Tony Dow Sculpture

1945 births
2022 deaths
20th-century American male actors
21st-century American male actors
20th-century American sculptors
21st-century American sculptors
American male child actors
American male television actors
American television directors
California National Guard personnel
Deaths from cancer in California
Male actors from Los Angeles
People from Topanga, California
Sculptors from California
Van Nuys High School alumni
Deaths from liver cancer